"Sleeping Beauty" is a science fiction short story by Arthur C. Clarke, first published in the magazine  Infinity Science Fiction in April 1957, and later anthologized in Tales from the White Hart. Like the rest of the collection, it is a frame story set in the fictional pub "White Hart", where Harry Purvis narrates the secondary tale.

Plot summary
A discussion of bizarre names leads Harry Purvis to describe Sigmund Snoring, whose family had one of those European names that "starts with 'Sch' and carries on in the same manner" but Anglicized it with unfortunate results.  Sigmund, or to be more accurate, his wife, discovers that he lives up to his name on his wedding night, which is unfortunate because he stands to inherit a large fortune if he remains married and reaches the age of 30 without separation or divorce.  In an effort to ensure his future he contacts his uncle Hymie, a famous physiologist.  Hymie has Sigmund sign a contract guaranteeing him a big cut of the inheritance, and produces a serum which stops Sigmund's snoring.  It also renders him unable to sleep.  After some months of 24-hour days, Sigmund pleads for an antidote.  This is duly produced, putting Sigmund to sleep, never to wake again.  His wife approves of the arrangement and in due course takes the inheritance on his behalf, putting it to good use on the French Riviera.

References

Short stories by Arthur C. Clarke
1957 short stories
Tales from the White Hart